Hoder may refer to:

 Hoder (Marvel Comics), fictional character
 Susanne Hoder, member of the United Methodist Church New England Conference, politically active in the Israeli–Palestinian conflict
 Hossein Derakhshan (born 1975), Iranian-born Canadian journalist nicknamed "Hoder"
 4669 Høder, main belt asteroid

See also
 Höðr, Norse mythological figure
 Hodder (disambiguation)
 Hodor (disambiguation)